Bad Kissingen is an electoral constituency (German: Wahlkreis) represented in the Bundestag. It elects one member via first-past-the-post voting. Under the current constituency numbering system, it is designated as constituency 248. It is located in northwestern Bavaria, comprising the districts of Bad Kissingen, Haßberge, and Rhön-Grabfeld.

Bad Kissingen was created for the inaugural 1949 federal election. Since 2009, it has been represented by Dorothee Bär of the Christian Social Union (CSU).

Geography
Bad Kissingen is located in northwestern Bavaria. As of the 2021 federal election, it comprises the districts of Bad Kissingen, Haßberge, and Rhön-Grabfeld.

History
Bad Kissingen was created in 1949. In the 1949 election, it was Bavaria constituency 37 in the numbering system. In the 1953 through 1961 elections, it was number 232. In the 1965 through 1998 elections, it was number 234. In the 2002 and 2005 elections, it was number 249. Since the 2009 election, it has been number 248.

Originally, the constituency comprised the independent city of Bad Kissingen and the districts of Landkreis Bad Kissingen, Ebern, Haßfurt, Hofheim, Königshofen, and Mellrichstadt. In the 1965 through 1972 elections, it also contained the district of Bad Neustadt an der Saale. It acquired its current borders in the 1976 election.

Members
Like most constituencies in rural Bavaria, it is an CSU safe seat, the party holding the seat continuously since its creation. It was first represented by Gustav Fuchs from 1949 to 1961, followed by Alex Hösl from 1961 to 1980. Eduard Lintner was representative from 1980 to 2009, a total of eight consecutive terms. Dorothee Bär was elected in 2009, and re-elected in 2013, 2017, and 2021.

Election results

2021 election

2017 election

2013 election

2009 election

References

Federal electoral districts in Bavaria
1949 establishments in West Germany
Constituencies established in 1949
Bad Kissingen (district)
Haßberge (district)
Rhön-Grabfeld